Damasławek  is a village in Wągrowiec County, Greater Poland Voivodeship, in west-central Poland. It is the seat of the gmina (administrative district) called Gmina Damasławek.

The village has a population of 2,500.

References

Villages in Wągrowiec County